Søre Øyane is a village in the municipality of Bjørnafjorden in Vestland county, Norway. It is located on an archipelago in the Bjørnafjorden, off the western coast of the municipality, southeast of the larger island of Strøno. The archipelago consists of four major islands, Røtinga, Bruarøy, Sundøy, and Lepsøy, as well as several smaller islands and islets, many of which are uninhabited. Lepsøy, the northernmost island, is located adjacent to the mainland, which it is connected to by a short bridge.  A longer bridge spans the strait between Lepsøy and Sundøy, which in turn is connected to Røtinga and a smaller island, Brattholmen, through Bruarøy.

References 

Bjørnafjorden
Villages in Vestland